The 1940 Kent State Golden Flashes football team was an American football team that represented Kent State University during the 1940 college football season. In their sixth season under head coach Donald Starn, the Golden Flashes compiled an 8–1 record  and outscored all opponents by a combined total of 186 to 43.

Schedule

References

Kent State
Kent State Golden Flashes football seasons
Kent State Golden Flashes football